"Sur le Pont d'Avignon" ("On the Bridge of Avignon") is a French song about a dance performed on the Pont d'Avignon (officially Pont Saint-Bénézet) that dates back to the 15th century.
The dance actually took place under the bridge and not on the bridge (not sur).

Dance description 

 It starts out with everyone in pairs and they dance around each other.
 When the chorus is done stop in front of your partner and traditionally the male will bow on the first part then tip his hat on the second.
 When the chorus begins again repeat step one.
 When this stops so does the dance and then the girl curtsies to one side then the other side.
 For the first part, repeat step one and then if you have an audience turn on your heel and bow to them.

Lyrics

Chorus 

Sur le Pont d'Avignon
L'on y danse, l'on y danse
Sur le Pont d'Avignon
L'on y danse tous en rond.
 
On the bridge in Avignon
They are dancing there, They are dancing there

On the bridge in Avignon
They all dance in circles there

First verse 
Les beaux messieurs font comme ça
Et puis encore comme ça.

The fine gentlemen go like this (bow) And then again like this.

Second verse 
Les belles dames font comme ça
Et puis encore comme ça.

The beautiful ladies go like this (curtsy)
And then again like that.

Third verse 
Les filles font comme ça
Et puis encore comme ça.

The young girls go like this (salute)
And then like that.

Fourth verse 
Les musiciens font comme ça
Et puis encore comme ça.

The musicians go like this (they all bow to women)
And then like that.

Variation 
American music publisher Cherry Lane Music Company has printed a different verse (1993):

Les jeunes filles font comme ça
Les jeunes gens font comme ça
 
The young girls go like this,
The young people go like this.

In popular culture 

In 1951, the National Film Board of Canada produced the 5-minute animated film Sur le Pont d'Avignon, in which extravagantly-dressed marionettes pantomime the song.

The French fantasy comic book Hypocrite: comment decoder l'etircopyh by Jean-Claude Forest (pub. Dargaud 1973) centres around the destruction of the Pont de Avignon, here imagined as a giant petrified sabre-toothed tiger spanning the river. During the scenes set on the bridge itself, the characters sing this song, led by the ghostly Scottish piper Major Grumble.

In the 1978 American miniseries Holocaust, some of the children in the Warsaw Ghetto sing the song in class with Berta Weiss.

In 1990, The Simpsons' episode The Crepes of Wrath (season 1), Bart Simpson sings the song on the way to his accommodation during his student exchange program.

The Star Trek: The Next Generation episode "Chain of Command" (1992) uses this song as a means for Captain Picard, an appreciator of philosophy and poetry born in France, to resist the effects of torture.

In 1992, a cartoon titled "The Real Story of..... Sur La Pont D'Avignon" was produced by CINAR and France Animation, featuring the song and a ghost story revolving around a clockmaker and an enchanted organ.

In the German-dubbed version of The Lion King (1994), Zazu sings the song to Scar after being forced by latter to sing something more cheerful than "Nobody Knows the Trouble I've Seen", and instead of singing "I've Got a Lovely Bunch of Coconuts".

References

External links

Avignon
French folk songs
French-language songs
Year of song unknown
European folk dances
Group dances
Songs about dancing
Songs about cities
Songs about France